Tamás Horváth may refer to:

Tamás Horváth (footballer, born 1983), Hungarian football defender
Tamás Horváth (footballer, born 1987), Hungarian football goalkeeper
Tamás Horváth (footballer, born 1991), Hungarian football midfielder